Charlotte Denise "Charly" McClain (born March 26, 1956) is an American country music singer, best known for a string of hits during the 1980s. McClain's biggest hits include "Who's Cheatin' Who", "Sleepin' with the Radio On", and "Radio Heart".

Early life
McClain was born in Memphis, Tennessee, United States, to Virginia (née Wiggins; 1934–2009) and Niles McClain. The nickname "Charly" would come from the neighborhood friends that she played with as a child. McClain used it when she began her career playing hotel lounges. Her first experience recording was when father Niles had tuberculosis when she was eight. As she was under age to comply with hospital visiting policy, she had to communicate with him through a tape recorder. That inspired her interest in recording. She began her musical career at age 12 performing with her brother Mike and their band, Charlotte & the Volunteers. The band  performed together for the next six years.

Her first TV appearance was on the local WBBJ morning show in Jackson, Tennessee. By the age of 17, she was a regular on the club circuit, and appeared at the Memphis show Mid-South Jamboree from 1973–1975.

Recording career

Steady rise
At the age of 20, McClain signed her first recording contract with Epic Records in 1976. McClain's distinct vocal sound provided an edge in recognizability—as did her attractive appearance. McClain debuted in late 1976 with her first single, "Lay Down," which peaked at No. 67 on the Billboard Country Chart. McClain's initial singles in 1976 and 1977, from her debut album Here's Charly McClain, failed to appear highly on the country chart. McClain's second album, Let Me Be Your Baby, was released in 1978. She hit country's Top Ten for the first time in 1978 with "That's What You Do to Me,"  followed by two other Top 25 hits, "Let Me Be Your Baby," and "Take Me Back."

In 1979 McClain released Alone Too Long, which included the Top-20 hits "When A Love Ain't Right" and "You're a Part of Me". The Women Get Lonely album followed in 1980, featuring the Top 10 hit "Men", which peaked at No. 7 in 1980, and the Top-20 duet with Johnny Rodriguez, "I Hate the Way I Love It." However, breakthrough success still eluded McClain.

Achieving success
McClain hit No. 1 on the country chart in 1981 with "Who's Cheatin' Who". In 1981, McClain scored three Top-10 hits off her Surround Me with Love album: the title track, "Sleepin' with the Radio On", and "The Very Best is You". McClain's albums were beginning to become more successful as well. Her Who's Cheatin' Who album peaked at No. 28 on the Top Country Albums chart, and her 1981 album, Surround Me With Love went to number 9.

In 1983, McClain hit No. 1 again with her Mickey Gilley duet "Paradise Tonight." McClain's and Gilley's duet partnership became so successful, they released a duet album the following year titled It Takes Believers. The record contained the Top-5 hit, "Candy Man" (No. 5 on the Billboard Country Chart), and the top twenty hit, "The Right Stuff".

McClain also acted; she appeared as a guest star on such shows as Hart to Hart (in 1981 episode titled "Rhinestone Harts") and CHiPs (in 1983 episode "Country Action"). McClain's lonely life on the road was also chronicled in a 1981 HBO special titled So You Want to Be a Star.

After having a series of hit singles in 1984, McClain released another best-selling album, Radio Heart in 1985. The album's title track became a No. 1 Country hit in 1985; McClain's last No. 1 to date. The album also spawned two other Top-10 hits that year. McClain married former soap star Wayne Massey in 1984, and their duet "With Just One Look in Your Eyes" reached number five. The third single off the album was also a duet with Massey. It was titled "You Are My Music, You Are My Song". The Radio Heart album peaked at No. 15 on the Top Country Albums chart in 1985. In 1986, Charly and Wayne released a duet album When Love Is Right and the first single "When It's Down to Me and You" peaked at No. 17.

Later years
After 1986, McClain's success began to subside. Her 1987 Still I Stay album brought only one Top 40 single; "Don't Touch Me There" peaked at No. 20 on the Billboard Country Chart. The album became McClain's last album with Epic. Upon fulfilling her contract, she parted ways with the record label the following year. She continued to chart until her last recording came in 1989.   She recorded one studio album with Mercury Records before the end of the decade. Her last charted single was "You Got the Job", which peaked at No. 65. McClain has not recorded a studio album since 1988's self-titled album on Mercury Records.

Retirement and family
Preferring to spend more time with her husband and their families, McClain retired completely from touring, public appearances, and performances in the early 1990s. Later, she helped to care for her mother Virginia before she died in 2009.

Charly McClain and Wayne Massey have no children together. However, Massey does have a son from his first marriage.

Several compilation albums of McClain's music have been released over the years. Probably the most noteworthy of these is 1999's Anthology. It included all of McClain's successful singles from her career with Epic. She continues to reside with her husband Wayne in the Memphis, Tennessee, area.

Discography

References

External links
 CMT.com: Charly McClain
 
 

1956 births
20th-century American singers
20th-century American women singers
Living people
American country singer-songwriters
American women country singers
Musicians from Memphis, Tennessee
Singer-songwriters from Tennessee
Country musicians from Tennessee
Epic Records artists
Mercury Records artists
21st-century American women